Leichhardt Oval is a rugby league and soccer stadium in Lilyfield, New South Wales, Australia. It is currently one of three home grounds for the Wests Tigers National Rugby League (NRL) team, along with Campbelltown Stadium and Western Sydney Stadium. Prior to its merger with the Western Suburbs Magpies, it was the longtime home of the Balmain Tigers, who used the ground from 1934–1994 and 1997–1999. It was named after Ludwig Leichhardt.

As of July 2012, Leichhardt Oval is the most played-on Australian professional rugby league ground in active use in the National Rugby League, having hosted 794 games since Balmain played its first game at the ground against Western Suburbs in Round 1 of the 1934 NSWRFL season, held on ANZAC Day, Wests winning the game 18-5. Balmain's first win at the ground came in the very next game of the 1934 season with a 27-13 win over University.

History
Leichhardt Oval was first used as a rugby league football ground in 1934 and became the home ground of the Balmain Tigers. The ground underwent a major overhaul during the 1970s when the configuration of the ground was changed (from east-west to north-south) and lighting installed. As it was one of the few rugby league grounds with lighting and was located close to the city, Leichhardt Oval began to be used for non-Balmain games such as the pre-origin interstate games between NSW and Queensland (Leichhardt was originally preferred to the Sydney Cricket Ground for interstate games from 1978 due to dwindling crowds in an era when NSW dominated the contests. Also, unlike the SCG at the time, Leichhardt had lights allowing for night games).

On 16 June 1981, Leichhardt Oval hosted the last interstate game between NSW and Qld played under the old 'State of Residence' rules before the permanent move to the now familiar State of Origin series. The game, which attracted only 6,268 fans, saw the Steve Rogers captain NSW, with Qld Origin players John Ribot, Paul McCabe and Rod Morris in the side, win a surprisingly competitive game 22–9. Playing that night were some of the stars of the game at the time including: Chris Anderson, Noel Cleal, Steve Mortimer, Ray Price and Les Boyd (NSW), coached by Ted Glossop, and Mal Meninga, Gene Miles, Chris Close and Wally Lewis (Qld), who were captain-coached by Arthur Beetson.

From 1974, with the ground having lights for night football, Leichhardt was also used as the base of the NSWRL's annual mid-week competition, hosting most of the games and all Finals from 1974 until 1986 before the Final was moved to the new Parramatta Stadium in 1987. The last Mid-week Final held at Leichhardt was the 1986 National Panasonic Cup Final, with the Parramatta Eels defeating Balmain 32–16.

On 4 August 1985 a crowd of 21,707 set a then Balmain Tigers ground attendance record for a Round 22 clash in the 1985 Winfield Cup against the St. George Dragons, won 17–15 by St. George. This remained the Tigers attendance record for only four years until beaten by the 22,750 who attended the Round 22 match against Penrith in 1989.

Balmain left the ground after the 1994 NSWRL season when they moved to Parramatta Stadium as part of an identity change to the Sydney Tigers. The move was not popular with supporters however and the club returned to Leichhardt for the 1997 season, with the Balmain name returning. Balmain played their final game as a stand-alone team in 1999 when they defeated Parramatta 20–10 in appalling conditions. The ground then became one of the home grounds of the new Wests Tigers team.

Leichhardt Oval Today (2000–present)
The ground remains a venue for high level rugby league in Australia although it currently holds only four NRL games a year. This decision to reduce the number of games is mainly financial and related to issues such as ground capacity, corporate facilities, and financial incentives to play games at Bankwest Stadium and ANZ Stadium. Ironically for a ground once prized for its lighting, the cost of playing night games is another factor as the current lighting is not considered acceptable.

In spite (or perhaps because) of its antiquated facilities, Leichhardt Oval is beloved by Tigers fans especially those who formerly supported Balmain. Match attendances are usually close to or at capacity. Attempts to improve facilities are underway with the goal to return Leichhardt to its place as a top level rugby league venue.

In 2007, the New South Wales Government announced it would provide finance to help in the redevelopment of the ground. Previously it had provided a loan to match grants made from Leichhardt Council and the Balmain Football Club. A group known as Stop the Rot aims to revamp the ground into a first class sporting venue. A.P.I.A. Leichhardt Tigers were renamed Sydney Tigers before the start of the 2009 New South Wales Premier League, and moved their home ground from Lambert Park back to Leichhardt Oval, for the first time in over a decade. A-League club Sydney FC also played a pre-season friendly against rivals Central Coast Mariners on 6 June 2009. The stadium continues to host pre-season games for Sydney teams, friendly games for Australian national youth teams and FFA Cup games. In 2011 Lambert Park received a major upgrade that installed a synthetic pitch, which has seen higher profile matches moved to the Oval as professional teams prefer not to risk injury on a non-natural surface.

On 21 November 2009, Leichhardt Oval hosted 2 matches in a double-header of the W-League. Sydney FC took on Perth Glory while after that Melbourne Victory played the Central Coast Mariners. During 2009, the thirty-year lease of Leichhardt Oval by the Wests Tigers Franchise, came to an end.

In 2009, the Keith Barnes Stand and Norm Robinson Stand were named in honour of Balmain Tigers greats, Keith Barnes and Norm Robinson.

From 2005 until 2012, it was home of the Balmain-Ryde Eastwood Tigers (an amalgamation between Balmain and the old Sydney Metropolitan League side Ryde Eastwood), who played in the New South Wales Cup competition. From 2013 until 2017, the club joined forces with the Western Suburbs Magpies, and formed the Wests Tigers (just like the first grade competition). From 2018 onwards, Wests Tigers changed their reserves team to the Western Suburbs Magpies. This NSW Cup club now shares its home games between Leichhardt Oval and Campbelltown Stadium.

The Australian rugby union football team Sydney Stars, a joint venture between the Sydney University and Balmain rugby clubs, announced Leichhardt Oval as its home ground in the National Rugby Championship (NRC).

On 28 June 2015, the laneway at Leichhardt Oval was named "Laurie's Lane" in honour of former long-time Balmain Tigers fan Laurie Nichols.

On 22 June 2019, two Rugby League Test matches were played at Leichhardt Oval, with Fiji playing Lebanon in game one, with Papua New Guinea and Samoa playing in the second game.

On 29 September 2019, the St. George Illawarra Dragons played the Sydney Roosters in the first standalone NRL Women's Premiership match to be played in Australia.

On 6 August 2022, Leichhardt Oval hosted St Ignatius College Riverview v St Joseph’s College Hunters Hill for the GPS rugby union competition. The game was to be played at Riverview, however, it was relocated to Leichhardt Oval due to the expected crowd of 15,000. Near the end of the match the railing of a small grandstand collapsed and several spectators were injured.

Attendance record
The stadium has a nominal capacity of 20,000. However, its recorded highest crowd figure is 23,000, which occurred for the 1981 Tooth Cup Final between South Sydney and Cronulla. The Wests Tigers' highest attendance at the venue is 22,877, which was set on 24 July 2005 as the Tigers defeated South Sydney 42–20. The highest recorded crowd for a Balmain Tigers game is 22,750. This record was set on 27 August 1989, for a Round 22 NSWRL game against the Penrith Panthers, won 33–6 by the Grand Final bound Tigers.

Gallery

Interstate matches
List of interstate matches played between New South Wales and Queensland at Leichhardt Oval.

Midweek Cup Finals
Leichhardt Oval played host to 13 Amco Cup / Tooth Cup / KB Cup / Panasonic Cup Finals between 1974 and 1986.

References

External links
 

Sports venues in Sydney
Rugby league stadiums in Australia
Rugby union stadiums in Australia
Balmain Tigers
Wests Tigers
1934 establishments in Australia
Sports venues completed in 1934
A-League Women stadiums
Sydney FC (A-League Women)